The House of Assembly is the lower house of the Parliament of Saint Lucia, elected by popular vote. The upper house is the Senate. It has 17 or 18 members: 17 members elected for a five-year term in single-seat constituencies, and a speaker elected by the 17 members, who may be one of their number or a person chosen from outside the House. To be elected to the house, a person must be at least 21 years old.

History
House of Assembly was established in 1967 when associated statehood was attained. It replaced the legislative council.

Relationship with the government
Section 60 of the constitution of Saint Lucia requires the prime minister of Saint Lucia to be a member of the House of Assembly. It provides for the governor-general to "appoint a member of the House who appears to him likely to command the support of the majority of the members of the House" and for the office to fall vacant if the prime minister ceases to be a member of the House of Assembly for any reason other than the dissolution of parliament.

Latest general election

Current composition
Following the election of 26 July 2021, the House of Assembly of Saint Lucia comprises the following members:

Constituencies 

Saint Lucia has 17 electoral segments, each of which elects one Parliamentary Representative to the House of Assembly:

See also
List of speakers of the House of Assembly of Saint Lucia
Districts of Saint Lucia

References

External links
 

Politics of Saint Lucia
Political organisations based in Saint Lucia
Government of Saint Lucia
Saint Lucia
1967 establishments in the British Empire